Vinod Kumar Shukla (Hindi: विनोद कुमार शुक्ला) aka Babbu Bhaiya, is an Indian businessman and social worker

Shukla is part of the Bhaiya Lal Shukla family of Amahiya Rewa. He was an independent candidate from Mauganj for the Madhya Pradesh State Assembly Elections held on 25 November 2013. He joined the Indian National Congress in 2019.

References

External links 
http://www.mpcongress.org/
http://www.recrewa.ac.in/

1958 births
Indian National Congress politicians
Living people